James Fairley Cameron (born 7 December 1946) is a Scottish former professional footballer, who played as a left back in the Scottish Football League. He made over 200 appearances for Dundee United, and also played for Falkirk, Forfar Athletic and Montrose.

Playing career
Jim Cameron joined Dundee United in October 1966 from Ashfield, having turned down contract offers from Leicester City and Stirling Albion, and was one of three players from the Glasgow-based junior club signed by United manager Jerry Kerr around that time.  After performing well in the reserve team, he made his first team debut in the Scottish Football League in April 1967, in a 2–2 draw against Partick Thistle at Tannadice Park. The following month Dundee United travelled to the United States, to represent the Dallas Tornado franchise in the new United Soccer Association (USA) league. With regular left back Jimmy Briggs initially left out due to a contract dispute, Cameron was included in the squad and featured regularly on the tour, playing in ten of the twelve USA matches.

Returning to Scotland, Cameron began the 1967–68 season in the reserves until Briggs suffered a broken leg in February 1968. This gave Cameron his opportunity in the first team, and he rarely missed a match over the next four years. In December 1971, Jim McLean replaced Kerr as Dundee United manager and made a new left back, Frank Kopel, his first signing. By the beginning of the 1972–73 season, Kopel had replaced Cameron as first choice in the position. Cameron was transfer listed in October 1972 but didn't leave the club until September 1973 when he was transferred to Falkirk for a £7000 fee. He made a total of 208 competitive appearances for Dundee United, scoring his only goal in a 3–2 win over Dunfermline Athletic on Christmas Day 1971.

Cameron went on to play over 100 games for Falkirk, and also had spells with Montrose and Forfar Athletic before emigrating to Australia in 1981.

Notes

References

Sources

Association football fullbacks
1946 births
Scottish footballers
Ashfield F.C. players
Dundee United F.C. players
Falkirk F.C. players
Montrose F.C. players
Forfar Athletic F.C. players
Scottish Football League players
Scottish Junior Football Association players
Scottish emigrants to Australia
Dallas Tornado players
United Soccer Association players
Living people